Ustjanowa Dolna  is a village in the administrative district of Gmina Ustrzyki Dolne, within Bieszczady County, Subcarpathian Voivodeship, in south-eastern Poland.

The village has a population of 280.

References

Ustjanowa Dolna